Ian Roberts (born 31 July 1965) is a British-born Australian actor, IT managed services consultant and former professional rugby league footballer who played in the 1980s and 1990s. A New South Wales State of Origin and Australian international representative forward, he played club football with the South Sydney Rabbitohs, Wigan Warriors, Manly Warringah Sea Eagles and North Queensland Cowboys. In 1995 Roberts became the first high-profile Australian sports person and first rugby footballer in the world to come out to the public as gay.

Early life
Ian Roberts was born in 1965 in Chelsea, London, England, to a father who worked in construction and was an amateur boxer, and a housewife mother. The family emigrated as Ten Pound Poms in 1967 to South Sydney, Australia, where the family was guaranteed a new house, and his father was guaranteed a job, continuing to work in construction. He was educated at Maroubra Bay High School.

Football career

Club career
As a junior Roberts played for the Mascot Jets in the Souths juniors competition. He made his first grade début with the Rabbitohs in the 1986 Winfield Cup season and his form early on saw him touted as a bolter for the 1986 Kangaroo Tour, though ultimately he would miss selection.

At the end of the 1986 Sydney season, Roberts began a short stint with English club Wigan. In his first appearance for the Cherry and Whites on 1 October against St. Helens at Central Park in Wigan, Roberts came on after 8 minutes as a replacement and made an astonishing 59 tackles as the home side won their Lancashire County Cup Semi-final 22–16. Two weeks later he played for Wigan in the  against the Australian Kangaroos for the opening game of the 1986 Kangaroo Tour which Australia won 26–18. He played second row (replaced by interchange/substitute Rob Louw) in Wigan's 15–8 victory over Oldham in the Lancashire County Cup Final at Knowsley Road in St. Helens, on Sunday 19 October 1986 during the 1986–87 season. and played second row in Wigan's 18–4 victory over Warrington in the 1986–87 John Player Special Trophy Final during the 1986–87 season at Burnden Park in Bolton on Saturday 10 January 1987.

By the age of 21, Jack Gibson had described him as "the best front rower in the game," and in 1988 Roberts made the first of five appearances for City Origin team.

Despite not having yet played for either New South Wales or Australia, Roberts signed a contract with the Manly Warringah Sea Eagles in 1990. Roberts later reported that the main reason he left South Sydney was the money, the Manly contract worth around AU$100,000 more.

After moving from the South Sydney club to Manly he quickly justified his value with State of Origin selection and a Test début against New Zealand. At the end of the 1994 NSWRL season, he went on the 1994 Kangaroo tour. Leading up front in Australia's Ashes winning 23-4 Third Test victory at Elland Road. Not long after, Roberts signed with Super League despite his club and coach Bob Fulton remaining loyal to the Australian Rugby League. He played in Manly's loss to Canterbury in the 1995 ARL season's Grand Final.

Roberts sat out the 1996 season due to injuries and a contract dispute related to the Super League war. In 1997, Roberts signed with the North Queensland Cowboys and moved to Townsville to captain the side. His career wound down in 1998 under the increasing weight of injuries.

State of Origin
Roberts made nine appearances for the New South Wales State of Origin team between 1990 and 1994. He was an enforcer in the NSW forward pack. A fit athlete, he collapsed from exhaustion after a tireless effort in game one of 1993. The Blues won six of the nine matches in which Roberts played.

Post-playing
In 2000, Roberts was awarded the Australian Sports Medal for his contribution to Australia's international standing in rugby league. He served on the National Rugby League's judiciary during the 2000s and in 2004 was named by Souths in their South Sydney Dream Team, which consists of 17 players and a coach representing the club from 1908 through to 2004. In 2005, he was named one of the 25 greatest ever New South Wales players. In March 2014, Roberts revealed that he has brain damage after being knocked out up to a dozen times in his playing career.

Life outside football
Roberts came out as gay in 1995, becoming the first rugby league player in the world to do so. He discussed his sexuality in magazines and on television over the following year. The NRL Footy Show principals Paul Vautin, Peter Sterling and Steve Roach appeared in a poster campaign against homophobia conducted by the Lesbian and Gay Anti-Violence Project. He was praised for helping to question prevailing myths about gays and sport. Paul Freeman wrote a book on Roberts, Ian Roberts – Finding Out, which was published in 1997.

In 1999 Roberts was taken to court by Garry Jack over an on-field brawl that occurred in 1991. Jack stated he was taking a stand against a beating he received from several Manly players. He attempted to sue Roberts for $100,000 in damages, alleging he suffered shock, traumatic injuries to his face and eyes, cuts, headaches and numbness, and was embarrassed by scarring to his face. Jack and Roberts eventually settled the dispute out of court with Roberts handing over more than $50,000.

Roberts has stated he is a sex abuse victim, and gave evidence to the State Coroner of New South Wales in regard to the murder of Arron Light, a street prostitute who was set to give evidence against a paedophile syndicate. Light disappeared in 1997, and his remains were recovered in 2002. Roberts accused the same man who molested him in his teens of being behind Light's death. This story was the subject of an episode of the Australian TV program Australian Story, entitled "The Lost Boy", which first aired on 26 September 2005.

Early in 2005, Roberts appeared in the second series of the Australian television series Dancing with the Stars, dancing with Natalie Lowe. He was runner up in the competition, losing out to Tom Williams.

Roberts appeared on the 17 July 2007 cover of The Advocate magazine in an exclusive interview with Canadian author and journalist Michael Rowe, along with a photo layout by celebrity photographer Eric Schwabel.

In September 2010, Roberts publicly criticised Australian swimming star Stephanie Rice for calling the South African rugby union team "faggots" on Twitter, branding her "a complete idiot".

A member of the Australian Labor Party, Roberts has twice stood unsuccessfully as an ALP candidate for the Council of the City of Sydney in 2016 and 2021.

Acting career
Roberts finished playing professional rugby league in 1998, and began studying at the National Institute of Dramatic Art in Sydney. In 2003 he moved to the United States in search of acting opportunities.

Roberts made a very brief cameo in the 2002 film Star Wars: Episode II – Attack of the Clones as a bartender working in the Outlander Club where Obi-Wan Kenobi and Anakin Skywalker apprehend the bounty hunter Zam Wesell. In 2005, Roberts had a brief cameo in the Australian film Little Fish, starring Cate Blanchett and Hugo Weaving, playing an ex-rugby league star. He appeared in the 2006 motion picture Superman Returns as Riley, a henchman of Lex Luthor.

In 2009, Roberts appeared in the Australian television mini-series Underbelly: A Tale of Two Cities, which retells real life events of the drug trade in the New South Wales town of Griffith between 1976–1987. The mini-series is a prequel to the 2008 mini-series Underbelly, which was about Melbourne gangland killings. Roberts has a role as a body guard for George Freeman (played by Peter O'Brien). The series began airing in NSW on 9 February 2009. Also in 2009, he starred in The Cut on ABC1 and had a small role in the film Cedar Boys. In 2012 Ian landed his first starring role in the film Saltwater, starring opposite Ronnie Kerr, which is also Ian's first role playing a gay man.

In 2016 he appeared in Craig Boreham's gay-themed film Teenage Kicks, playing a straight single father. In 2022 he appeared in Boreham's followup film Lonesome.

References

Further reading

External links
 
 Australian Story Episode - The Lost Boy
 (re)Search my Trash interview

1965 births
Living people
Australian gay actors
Australia national rugby league team players
Australian male film actors
Australian male models
Australian expatriate sportspeople in England
English emigrants to Australia
Gay sportsmen
Australian LGBT sportspeople
LGBT rugby league players
Manly Warringah Sea Eagles players
National Institute of Dramatic Art alumni
Naturalised citizens of Australia
New South Wales City Origin rugby league team players
New South Wales Rugby League State of Origin players
North Queensland Cowboys players
Recipients of the Australian Sports Medal
Rugby league players from London
Rugby league props
Rugby league second-rows
South Sydney Rabbitohs players
Wigan Warriors players
Rugby league players from Sydney
Sportsmen from New South Wales